Kris Gerits (born 27 September 1971 in Hasselt) is a Belgian former professional road racing cyclist. He was professional from 1994 until 2002, spending all his career with just one team, Vlaanderen.

Palmarès

1997
Circuit Franco-Belge, 1 stage
1998
Zellik–Galmaarden
Omloop van de Westkust De Panne
Circuit Franco-Belge, 1 stage
Tienen Criterium
1999
Bayern Rundfahrt, 1 stage
Eurode Omloop
2001
Le Samyn

External links

1971 births
Living people
Belgian male cyclists
Sportspeople from Hasselt
Cyclists from Limburg (Belgium)